Prince Karl (Karl Borromäus) Michael Joseph of Liechtenstein (Vienna, 29 September 1730 – Vienna, 21 February 1789) was the second son of Emanuel, Prince of Liechtenstein (1700–1771) and Maria Anna Antonia, Countess of Dietrichstein-Weichselstädt, Baroness of Hollenburg and Finkenstein, and younger brother of Franz Joseph I, Prince of Liechtenstein.

He was the 805th Knight of the Order of the Golden Fleece in Austria in 1772.

Family
On 30 March 1761, in Vienna, he married Maria Eleonore Prinzessin zu Oettingen-Oettingen und Oettingen-Spielberg (Oettingen, 7 July 1745 - Vienna, 26 November 1812).

They had seven children:

 Princess Maria Josepha Eleonore Nicolaus (Vienna, 4 December 1763 - Vienna, 23 September 1833), married in Vienna on 29 January 1782 Johann Nepomuck Graf von Harrach zu Rohrau und Thannhausen (Vienna, 17 May 1756 - Vienna, 11 April 1829), without issue.
 Prince Karl Joseph Emanuel Albinus (Vienna, 2 March 1765 - killed in duel in Vienna, 24 December 1795), married in Vienna on 28 September 1789 Marianne Josepha Gräfin von Khevenhüller-Metsch (Vienna, 19 November 1770 - Vienna, 10 August 1849), and had issue.
 Prince Joseph Wenzel Franz Anastasius (Vienna, 21 August 1767 - Vienna, 30 July 1842), a Priest in Salzburg, and later a military figure.
 Prince Emanuel Joseph Kaspar Melchior Balthasar (Vienna, 6 January 1770 - Vienna, 20 February 1773).
 Prince Moritz Joseph Johann Baptist Viktor (Vienna, 21 July 1775 - Vienna, 24 March 1819), married in Eisenstadt on 13 April 1806 Marie Leopoldine Prinzessin Esterházy von Galántha (Vienna, 31 January 1788 - Liebeschitz, 6 September 1846), and had issue:
 Prince Franz de Paula Joseph Aloys Crispin (Vienna, 26 October 1776 - of wounds received in battle on 23 June in Brussels, 27 June 1794), unmarried and without issue.
 Prince Aloys Gonzaga Joseph Franz de Paula Theodor (Vienna, 1 April 1780 - Prague, 4 November 1833), unmarried and without issue.

Ancestry

References

1802 births
1887 deaths
19th-century Austrian people
Princes of Liechtenstein
Nobility from Vienna
Knights of the Golden Fleece of Austria